The Tjörn Bridge (Swedish: Tjörnbron) is a cable-stayed bridge which together with two smaller bridges connects Stenungsund on mainland Sweden with the island Tjörn on the western coast of the country.

Inaugurated in 1981, the bridge was built in record time after its predecessor, the Almö Bridge, which was inaugurated in June 1960, collapsed after the bulk carrier  collided with its span at 1:30 AM on 18 January 1980 in fog and darkness.  Eight people died in seven vehicles that plunged into the sea before the bridge was closed.

External links

Cable-stayed bridges in Sweden
Bridges completed in 1981
Buildings and structures in Bohuslän